A total solar eclipse will take place on 17 October 2153 at the moon's descending node with a magnitude of 1.056. A solar eclipse occurs when the Moon passes between Earth and the Sun, thereby totally or partly obscuring the image of the Sun for a viewer on Earth. A total solar eclipse occurs when the Moon's apparent diameter is larger than the Sun's, blocking all direct sunlight, turning day into darkness. Totality occurs in a narrow path across Earth's surface, with the partial solar eclipse visible over a surrounding region thousands of kilometres wide. Totality lasts 4 minutes 36 seconds.

Visibility 
It will be visible at sunrise in western Canada, then crossing portions of the United States, and across the Atlantic Ocean. It will be visible as a partial eclipse over the mainland United States, northern South America, and at sunset a partial eclipse over northwestern Africa.

Locations experiencing totality

Alaska 
 Juneau

Alberta 
 Edmonton

Saskatchewan 
 Regina

Indiana 
 Indianapolis

Related eclipses

Saros 136

References 

2153 10 17
2153 10 17